Buckley Green is a small village and village green situated 0.75 miles north of Henley-in-Arden, Warwickshire. Population details can be found under Beaudesert

Villages in Warwickshire